Thodupuzha is a municipal town located in Idukki district, Kerala, India, that covers an area of . It lies on the banks of Thodupuzha river, which merges with the Kaliyar and Kothamangalam rivers at Muvattupuzha to form the Muvattupuzha river. The geographical classification of the Thodupuzha Region is Malanad or Keezhmalanad.

Thodupuzha is the largest town in Idukki district and is a main commercial center. The town is being modernized with the help of a program sponsored by the World Bank. It was once part of Travancore. The Thodupuzha municipality area is characterized by abundant vegetation.

Etymology 

The place was named Thodupuzha by Elasamprathi Narayana Varma from two words: thodu and puzha. It is believed that the stream developed into a river, and the town on the banks of the river came to be known as Thodupuzha. There is another version that defines thodu as "touch" instead. The Mattathil Kovilakam were the protectors and rulers of the region. The last ruler of the region was Elasamprathi Narayana Varma, who originally came from Trivandrum and was the representative of Maharaja Raja.

History 

The Vadakkumkur kings used to live in Karikode for several years. Vadakkumkur was a late medieval/early modern feudal principality located in Kerala. After the kingdom separated, Thekkumkur became an independent kingdom, while Vadakkumkur became a vassal of Cochin. During the time of Portuguese dominance in Cochin, disputes arose between the Vadakkumkur chieftain and the Kingdom of Cochin over the pepper trade, and the Vadakkumkur raja was killed in battle with Cochin and their Portuguese allies. After the attack, Vadakkumkur palace split into two branches: one was known as Mattathil Palace, which remained in Thondikkuzha; and the other one in Kadanadu Pala. Vadakkumkur and Thekkumkur were later annexed by Marthanda Varma and incorporated into the kingdom of Travancore. Maharaja appointed his representative known as Elasamprathi Narayana Varam to develop the region called Keezhmalainadu. Varam became known as the father of Keezhmalainadu and modern Thodupuzha.

Varam erected many monuments, including the government offices, Pandikasala, and temples. The Karikode mosque and other buildings in Thodupuzha and Muvattupuzha also date from his reign. He was the founder of the new style of tax collection in this region. Thodupuzha is an ancient town with a history dating back to many centuries. The Buddhist and Jain religions which made their first inroads into Kerala in 300 BC left their influence at Thodupuzha and neighboring areas. In the 14th century, Kerala was divided for administrative reasons into several provinces: Venadu, Otanadu, Navishainadu, Munjunadu, Vempolinadu, and Keezhmalainadu. Thodupuzha and Muvattupuzha were in Keezhmalainadu, which was in existence until 1600; in that year it lost a battle with Vadakkumkoor and became a part of it.

St George Forane Church at Muthalakodam, near Thodupuzha, is believed to have constructed before the 13th century. It is believed to have been set up in the 19th century by an ancient noble lady named (Mattathil Muthi). It was re-built several times since then. Today's magnificent church was built in the year 1973.

Mylacombu St Thomas Syro-Malabar Church, Thodupuzha is believed to be built in 660 AD by Syrian Christian settlers in Mylacombu near Thodupuzha who migrated from Kuravilangad, Kodungallur, Angamaly, Kadamattom and Vadakara, Koothattukulam.

When Kerala formed in 1956, Thodupuzha was part of the Ernakulam district and C. A. Mathew (മാത്യു ചൂരപുഴ) became the first member of the Kerala Legislative Assembly from 1957 to 1960, and from 1960 to 1965.. In 1972, the Idukki district was formed by merging the Thodupuzha taluk with the Devikulam, Udumbanchola and Peermade taluks, which were part of the Kottayam district.

Climate

Demographics 

As of 2011 Census, Thodupuzha Taluka with an area of  had total population of 325,951; males comprised 49% of the population and females 51%.  Literacy rate of Thodupuzha Taluka in 2011 were 95.56% in which, male and female literacy were 96.81% and 94.33% respectively. In Thodupuzha, 9% of the population was under 6 years of age.

Economy and infrastructure 

Thodupuzha's economy is driven by agriculture, business, and small industries. Farmers in Thodupuzha raise a number of crops, mostly rubber. Other crops such as pineapple, coconut, rice, pepper, cocoa, tapioca, banana, ginger, turmeric are also cultivated. The headquarters of the first manufacturing industry in the district, Dhanwanthari Vaidyasala, are in Thodupuzha.

Politics 

Thodupuzha was administered by a village panchayat and village union for several years, but on 1 September 1978, it was upgraded into a municipality. The municipality was formed by merging the Thodupuzha panchayat and the neighboring panchayats of Kumaramangalam, Karicodu, and Manacaud. The municipality was administered by a special officer for ten years. In 1988, elections were held and the first popularly elected municipal council was formed, with N. Chandran as the chairman.

Sports 
The Thodupuzha Cricket Stadium constructed by the Kerala Cricket Association is located in Karikkode, approximately five kilometers away from Thodupuzha, which is large enough to host two cricket matches at the same time.

Education 

 The first center of higher learning in the taluk was Newman College, Thodupuzha. It was established in 1964 by the Syrian Catholic Diocese of Kothamangalam and named after Cardinal Newman.
 The second college of Thodupuzha was established in 1982: St. Joseph's College in Arakkulam.
 The University College of Engineering, Thodupuzha, managed and run by the Mahatma Gandhi University, Kottayam, is located in Thodupuzha. The college started functioning in 1996.

Notable people 
 

 Ajitkumar Varma| Deputy Inspector General of Police| CIB| Indian High Commission London
 Asif Ali, film actor
 Askar Ali, film actor
 Asin, film actress
 P. K. Abdul Aziz, vice-chancellor of Aligarh Muslim University
 Dileesh Nair, film director and screenwriter
 Hakkim Shajahan, film actor
 Jaffar Idukki, film actor
 P. J. Joseph, leader of Kerala Congress and former minister in the Second Oommen Chandy ministry
 Neeta Pillai, film actress
 Pappachen Pradeep, defender for the India national football team, former captain of the U23 team.
 Honey Rose, film actress
 Nishanth Sagar, film actor
 Rajesh Touchriver, film director
 Shiny Wilson ( Abraham), Olympian and Asian Games Medal Winner
 Sivaangi Krishnakumar, singer and film actress
 Thodupuzha Vasanthi, film actress

See also

References

External links 

Cities and towns in Idukki district